Sogod may refer to:

 Sogod, Cebu, Philippines
 Sogod, Southern Leyte, Philippines